Ferdinand Johann Wiedemann ( in Hapsal (now Haapsalu) –  in Saint Petersburg) was an Estonian linguist who researched Uralic languages, mostly Estonian. Wiedemann was also a botanist.

Wiedemann was of German-Swedish origin. In 1869 he published an Estonian-German dictionary (Ehstnisch-deutsches Wörterbuch), which was the richest dictionary of Estonian words for a long time.

References

1805 births
1887 deaths
People from Haapsalu
People from Kreis Wiek
Baltic-German people
Linguists from Estonia
Estonian Finno-Ugrists
19th-century Estonian people
Directors of Asiatic Museum
Privy Councillor (Russian Empire)